The city of Chicago is divided into 77 community areas for statistical and planning purposes. Census data and other statistics are tied to the areas, which serve as the basis for a variety of urban planning initiatives on both the local and regional levels. The areas' boundaries do not generally change, allowing comparisons of statistics across time. The areas are distinct from but related to the more numerous neighborhoods of Chicago; an area often corresponds to a neighborhood or encompasses several neighborhoods, but the areas do not always correspond to popular conceptions of the neighborhoods due to a number of factors including historical evolution and choices made by the creators of the areas. , Near North Side is the most populous of the areas with over 105,000 residents, while Burnside is the least populous with just over 2,500. Other geographical divisions of Chicago exist, such as the "sides" created by the branches of the Chicago River, the wards of the Chicago City Council, and the parishes of the Roman Catholic Church.

The Social Science Research Committee at the University of Chicago defined the community areas in the 1920s based on neighborhoods or groups of related neighborhoods within the city. In this effort it was led by sociologists Robert E. Park and Ernest Burgess, who believed that physical contingencies created areas that would inevitably form a common identity. Except for the addition of two areas (O'Hare from land annexed by the city in 1956 and Edgewater's separation from Uptown in 1980) and expansions due to minor annexations, the areas' boundaries have never been revised to reflect change but instead have been kept stable. The areas have become a part of the culture of Chicago, contributing to its perception as a "city of neighborhoods" and breaking it down into smaller regions for easier analysis and local planning. Nevertheless, Park's and Burgess's ideas on the inevitability of physically related areas forming a common bond have been questioned, and the unchanging nature of the areas has at times been considered problematic with major subsequent changes in the urban landscape such as the construction of expressways.

History
During the 19th century wards were used by the Census Bureau for data at the level below cities. This was problematic as wards were political subdivisions and thus changed after each census, limiting their utility for comparisons over time. Census tracts were first used in Chicago in the 1910 Census. However, by the 1920s the Social Science Research Committee at the University of Chicago wanted divisions that were more natural and manageable than the arbitrarily-designated and numerous census tracts. The sociologist Robert E. Park led this charge, considering physical barriers such as railroads and the Chicago River to form distinctive and consistent areas within the city, which he deemed "natural" areas that would eventually merge into a distinctive identity. Ernest Burgess, a colleague of Park's who shared his thinking, was crucial in creating and naming the community areas. Initially able to identify 400 neighborhoods of the city, he considered that number excessive and trimmed it down to 80 and thereafter 75 by grouping related neighborhoods into a single community area. The Chicago Department of Public Health wished to present local differences in birth and death rates; it worked with the committee to produce the list of 75 community areas, which were divided into 935 census tracts.

After the community areas were introduced, the University of Chicago Press published data sorted by them from the 1920 and 1930 Censuses, as well as a citywide 1934 census to help collect data related to the Great Depression, in what was known as the Local Community Fact Book. With the exception of 1970 (whose data was published in 1980), it continued this publication for every subsequent census through 1990, expanding in the 1960s to also cover major suburbs of Chicago. The Chicago Metropolitan Agency for Planning continues this work by periodically publishing "Community Snapshots" of the community areas and suburbs, the most recent being data from 2018 published .

Only two major changes have occurred in the boundaries of the community areas. O'Hare was created from land that was annexed by Chicago in 1956 to control O'Hare International Airport. Edgewater was separated from Uptown in 1980 as residents considered being joined to it a detriment to obtaining aid for local improvements. In addition to these two there have been minor changes due to further annexations and additions to the Lake Michigan shoreline.

Use and reception
The areas are used for statistical and planning purposes by such professions as assessors, charities, and reporters. Shortly after their development they were used for all kinds of statistics, including movie theater distribution and juvenile delinquency. Although developed by the University of Chicago, they have been used by other universities in the Chicago area, as well as by the city and regional planners. They have contributed to Chicago's reputation as the "city of neighborhoods", and are argued to break up an intimidating city into more manageable pieces. Chicago was an early adopter of such a system, and  most cities in the United States still lacked analogous divisions.

The areas do not necessarily correspond to popular imagination of the neighborhoods. For example, the Pilsen and Back of the Yards neighborhoods are much better known than their respective community areas Lower West Side and New City. In the case of New City this was a deliberate choice; Burgess opted for the less common "New City" to name the area as "Back of the Yards" carried a stigma after the publication of Upton Sinclair's The Jungle, which made the area notorious for its poor living conditions. Some of these discrepancies are due to names that were common at the time of the adoption of community areas but have since been supplanted by others. The static nature of area boundaries is one of their benefits, but is also problematic at times such as when expressways were built in the mid-20th century and divided neighborhoods without the area boundaries being able to adapt. The concept of a "natural area" that underpinned Park's and Burgess's thinking has also been challenged.

List of community areas

Other geographic divisions of Chicago

Chicago is traditionally divided into the three "sides" of the North Side, West Side, and South Side by the Chicago River. These three sides are represented by the white stripes on the Flag of Chicago. The city is also divided into 50 wards for the purpose of electing one alderman each to the Chicago City Council. These wards have at times generated identities similar to neighborhoods. Unlike community areas, wards are adjusted decennially to account for population shifts. Another method of neighborhood nomenclature in heavily Catholic neighborhoods of Chicago has been to refer to communities in terms of parishes. For example, one might say, "I live in St. Gertrude's, but he is from Saint Ita's."

Notes

References

External links

Community Area 2000 and 2010 Census Population Comparisons
Community Areas Map (downloadable in common GIS formats) on City of Chicago Data Portal

 
Chicago-related lists
Geography of Chicago
 •